Guy Chauvet (2 October 1933 – 25 March 2007) was a French operatic singer in the tenor register, regarded as a Heldentenor.

Biography 
Born in Montluçon, Chauvet discovered his voice at the age of sixteen during a local party. At Cannes in 1954, he was the youngest member of the tenor competition and one of five prizewinners, with Alain Vanzo, Tony Poncet, Roger Gardes and Gustave Botiaux.

He started at the Palais Garnier as an Armored Man in The Magic Flute on 12 January 1959. To begin with, he held third roles in Aida with Renata Tebaldi and Rita Gorr and also in Samson et Dalila with Mario Del Monaco. He became the youngest tenor of the Paris Opera in the role of Faust in La Damnation de Faust on 20 September 1959. He has the same singing teachers as Georges Thill. His career as a strong tenor was thwarted by his teachers, and he only acquired his C at the age of 32.

Régine Crespin choose him as Énée; he next sang Arturo with Joan Sutherland as Lucia. He triumphed by interpreting Florestan and also sang in the world premiere of Jean-Jacques Grunenwald's Sardanapale, produced at the Opéra de Monte-Carlo on 25 April 1961.

Régine Crespin, Fiorenza Cossotto (with whom he sang Samson and Delilah), Gabriel Bacquier and Jon Vickers all worked with him, and he regarded Andréa Guiot as a sister. After a performance of Samson and Delilah at the Metropolitan, he obtained a standing ovation from the audience.

When Placido Domingo sang his first Otello in Paris, Chauvet was dressed and ready in case it was required he intervene.

He was the only French tenor to have sung Aida in Verona, alternating the role of Radames with Carlo Bergonzi, in August 1971 during the centenary of the opera's creation.

He was part of the revival of Meyerbeer's Le prophète with Marilyn Horne at the Metropolitan in 1977.

Guy Chauvet distinguished himself above all by the power of his emission, the timbre remaining clear and coppery throughout the whole range. He specialized in wide-ranging roles such as Faust of la damnation, Samson, Pagliacci, Otello, Radamès, Enée, Siegmund, Lohengrin, around the world and above all in performances with the Deutsche Oper Berlin. He was also the advocate of such little known operas as Cherubini's Les Abencérages.

References

External links 
 Guy Chauvet, le dernier Enée français on Forum opera
  Hommage à Guy Chauvet on ODB.Opéra
 Guy Chauvet on Discogs
 Guy Chauvet "Nessun dorma" TURANDOT / G.Puccini on YouTube

French operatic tenors
1933 births
2007 deaths
People from Montluçon
Recipients of the Legion of Honour
Knights of the Ordre national du Mérite
Chevaliers of the Ordre des Arts et des Lettres
20th-century French male opera singers